Massachusetts House of Representatives' 10th Plymouth district in the United States is one of 160 legislative districts included in the lower house of the Massachusetts General Court. It covers part of Plymouth County. Democrat Michelle DuBois of Brockton has represented the district since 2015.

Locales represented
The district includes the following localities:
 part of Brockton
 part of East Bridgewater
 West Bridgewater

The current district geographic boundary overlaps with those of the Massachusetts Senate's Norfolk, Bristol and Plymouth district and 2nd Plymouth and Bristol district.

Former locale
The district previously covered Bridgewater, circa 1872.

Representatives
 Elbridge Keith, circa 1858 
 Jarvis D. Burrell, circa 1859 
 Patrick McCarthy, circa 1888 
 William B. Baldwin, circa 1920 
 E. Gerry Brown, circa 1920 
 Sylvia Donaldson, 1923–1930
 Philip W. Johnston, circa 1975 
 John F. Cruz 1991–1992
 Christine Canavan 1993–2015
 Michelle DuBois, 2015–

See also
 List of Massachusetts House of Representatives elections
 Other Plymouth County districts of the Massachusetts House of Representatives: 1st, 2nd, 3rd, 4th, 5th, 6th, 7th, 8th, 9th, 11th, 12th
 List of Massachusetts General Courts
 List of former districts of the Massachusetts House of Representatives

Images
Portraits of legislators

References

External links
 Ballotpedia. Massachusetts House of Representatives Tenth Plymouth District
  (State House district information based on U.S. Census Bureau's American Community Survey).

House
Government of Plymouth County, Massachusetts